Mandora may refer to:

 Mandora, stringed instrument of the lute family
 Mandora (crater), crater on Mars
 Mandora (fruit), cross between mandarin and orange
 Mandora (painting), a 1910 oil painting by French artist Georges Braque
 Mandora Marsh, wetland system in Western Australia
 Mandora Station, grazing property in Western Australia
 Battle of Mandora on 13 March 1801, between British and French forces during the French campaign in Egypt and Syria

See also
 Mandola (disambiguation)
 Special:Search/Mandore*